Provincial road N765 (N765) is a road connecting N352 in Ens with N764 south of IJsselmuiden.

References

External links

765
765
765